Injac is a Serbian surname. Notable people with the surname include:

Dimitrije Injac (born 1980), Serbian footballer
Nenad Injac (born 1985), Serbian footballer

Serbian surnames